Min-soo, also spelled Min-su, is a Korean unisex given name, predominantly masculine. Its meaning differs based on the hanja used to write each syllable of the name. There are 27 hanja with the reading "min" and 67 hanja with the reading "soo" on the South Korean government's official list of hanja which may be registered for use in given names. It was the fifth-most popular name for baby boys in South Korea in 1990.

People with this name include:

Entertainers
Choi Min-soo (born 1962), South Korean male actor
Jo Min-su (born 1965), South Korean actress
Yoon Min-soo (born 1980), South Korean male singer and television personality

Sportspeople
Han Min-su (born 1970), South Korean male sledge hockey player
Park Min-su (born 1970), South Korean male cyclist
Kim Min-soo (judoka) (born 1975), South Korean male judoka
Kim Min-soo (footballer) (born 1984), South Korean male football player
Kang Min-soo (born 1986), South Korean male football player
Jeong Min-su (born 1991), South Korean male volleyball player
Lee Min-soo (born 1992), South Korean male football player
Park Min-soo (born 1994), South Korean male gymnast

Others
Jimmy Cha (born Cha Min-su, 1951), South Korean male professional go player
Minsoo Kang (born 1967), South Korean-born American male history professor
Don Spike (born Kim Min-soo, 1977), South Korean male composer

References

Korean unisex given names